"There's Nothin" is the fourth single from Sean Kingston's self-titled debut album. The single features Élan of the D.E.Y. and Juelz Santana. The album version features Paula DeAnda. The song was produced by J.R. Rotem and co-written by Sean Kingston and Evan "Kidd" Bogart.

Radio Disney aired a version without Juelz Santana that features only Sean Kingston and Élan. In the chorus, they change it from "Satisfy my needs" to "Make me feel at peace").

Music video
The video was released in February 2008.

Charts

References

2008 singles
Sean Kingston songs
The D.E.Y. songs
Juelz Santana songs
Music videos directed by Ray Kay
Song recordings produced by J. R. Rotem
Songs written by E. Kidd Bogart
Songs written by Sean Kingston
2007 songs
MNRK Music Group singles